Micromartinia is a genus of moths of the family Crambidae. It contains only one species, Micromartinia mnemusalis, which is found in Costa Rica, Brazil, French Guiana and Venezuela.

References

Spilomelinae
Taxa named by Hans Georg Amsel
Monotypic moth genera
Crambidae genera